Kareem Ennab (born 1 April 1987) is a Jordanian swimmer. He was born in Irbid. He competed in 50 metre freestyle at the 2012 Summer Olympics in London.

References

External links 
 

1987 births
Living people
People from Irbid
Jordanian male swimmers
Olympic swimmers of Jordan
Swimmers at the 2012 Summer Olympics
Swimmers at the 2010 Asian Games
Asian Games competitors for Jordan
21st-century Jordanian people